Irina Vladimirovna Gashennikova (born 11 May 1975) is a Russian retired ice hockey goaltender.

International career
Gashennikova represented Russia with the Russian national team at the Winter Olympic Games in 2002, 2006 and 2010. In the women's ice hockey tournament at the 2002 Salt Lake City Olympics, she played every minute in net for Team Russia, winning three games and posting a 93.26% save percentage, the fourth-best save percentage of the tournament. In the 2006 tournament, she again played in every game, claiming two victories as Russia finished 6th. At the 2010 tournament, she played four of Russia's five games, winning two, and posted 2.40 goals against average.

Gashennikova also appeared for Russia at seven IIHF Women's World Championships. Her first appearance came in 1997 IIHF Women's World Championship, where twenty-two goals were scored on her in five games. The most notable of these performances came in 2001 IIHF Women's World Championship, where she won three games to lead Russia to a bronze medal, the country's first in women's play.

Career statistics

International career

References
Additional data and statistics from:

 "Irina Gashennikova". fhr.ru. Russian Ice Hockey Federation. Retrieved 21 June 2020.
 “Archives”. hockeyarchives.info. Retrieved 21 June 2020.

External links

1975 births
Ice hockey players at the 2002 Winter Olympics
Ice hockey players at the 2006 Winter Olympics
Ice hockey players at the 2010 Winter Olympics
Living people
Olympic ice hockey players of Russia
Russian women's ice hockey goaltenders
Ice hockey people from Moscow
HC Tornado players